Cers may refer to:

 Cers (wind), very strong wind in the bas-Languedoc region of France
 Cers, Hérault, France
 CERS Cup, a roller hockey competition organized by the Comitée Européen de Rink-Hockey
 CERS (Centre for Relationship Marketing and Service Management), a research centre at the Hanken School of Economics, Finland
 Centre D'Etudes et de Recherches Scientifiques, a Syrian government agency
 Ceramide synthase (CerS), an enzyme of the endoplasmic reticulum that catalyzes the synthesis of ceramide

See also
 Cer (disambiguation)